Doderer is a German surname. It derives from the Upper German word toderer and means Stotterer in German, or a stuttering person in English. Variations include Doberer, Doder, Doderlein and Döderlein.

Notable people with the name include:

Doderer 
Joop Doderer (1921-2005), Dutch actor
Johanna Doderer (born 1969), Austrian composer
Minnette Doderer (1923-2005), American politician

von Doderer
Heimito von Doderer (1896-1966), Austrian writer

Variations
 Doberer
 Doder
 Doderlein
Döderlein (disambiguation)

References

German-language surnames